Eustace Mandeville Wetenhall Tillyard   (19 May 1889 – 24 May 1962) was an English classical and literary scholar who was Master of  Jesus College, Cambridge from 1945 to 1959.

Biography

Tillyard was born in Cambridge. His father Alfred Isaac Tillyard had served as mayor of Cambridge, and his mother Catharine Sarah née Wetenhall was a proponent of higher education for women. The author and mystic Aelfrida Tillyard (1883–1959) was an older sister. He was educated at the Perse School and Jesus College. He was interested in the classics and archaeology, and in 1911 went to Athens to study at the British School of Archaeology.

His knowledge of Greek helped him during the First World War, where he served with the British Expeditionary Force (1915–1916), the Salonika Force (1916–1919) and then as liaison officer with the Greek headquarters (1918–1919). He was made an Officer of the Order of the British Empire  in the 1919 Birthday Honours "for services rendered in connection with military operations in the Balkans." He also received the War Cross from Greece.

Following the war, he returned to Cambridge and devoted himself to the newly established English School. According to The Times, "Although not one of the Founding Fathers of the School, he rapidly became one of its central figures and its leading statesman — a position which, in spite of many changes in organization and personnel, he never really lost until his retirement from his University Lectureship in 1954. His influence was not mainly due to his very considerable gifts as a University politician; it was essentially the result of his whole-hearted devotion to the cause of English. Others may have won more widespread celebrity as scholars or as critics, but everyone in Cambridge knew that Tillyard, because of his selfless and unremitting thought and care for the good of the School, was its chief mainstay."

Tillyard was a Fellow in English (1926–1959) at Jesus College, later becoming Master (1945–1959). He is known mainly for his book The Elizabethan World Picture (1942), as background to Elizabethan literature, particularly Shakespeare, and for his works on John Milton. He is credited with having put forward the view that Elizabethan literature is not representative of "a brief period of humanism between two outbreaks of Protestantism" (viz., the English Reformation and the Thirty Years' War), but rather representative of a theological bond in England that allowed for a continuation of the medieval view of World Order.

His historical scholarship and contextual analysis informed the study of 16th-century literature and became the foundation for much of what Cambridge undergraduates would study in preparation for their examinations.

Personal life
In 1919, Tillyard married Phyllis Mudie Cooke, a classical archaeologist. They had one son and two daughters, Angela and Veronica, who died in 2017 and 2019 respectively. He died in Cambridge, aged 73 and is buried in Histon Road Cemetery, Cambridge.

Works

The Athenian Empire and the Great Illusion (1914)
The Hope Vases: a Catalogue and a Discussion of the Hope Collection of Greek Vases with an Introduction on the History of the Collection and on Late Attic and South Italian vases (1923)
Lamb's Criticism. A Selection from the Literary Criticism of Charles Lamb (1923)
Milton: Private Correspondence and Academic Exercises (1932) with Phyllis B. Tillyard
The Poetry of Sir Thomas Wyatt: A Selection and a Study (1929)
Shakespeare's Last Plays (1938)
The Personal Heresy: A Controversy (1939) with C. S. Lewis
The Elizabethan World Picture: A Study of the Idea of Order in the age of Shakespeare, Donne & Milton (1942)
 Published by Pelican Book: The Elizabethan World Picture, 1972 and later prints.
Shakespeare's History Plays (1944)
Milton (1946)
The Miltonic Setting: Past and Present (1947)
Poetry and Its background: Illustrated By Five Poems 1470-1870 (1948)
Shakespeare's Problem Plays. Chatto and Windus, London 1949.
Studies in Milton (1951)
The English Renaissance, Fact Or Fiction? (1952)
The English Epic and its Background (1954)
The Metaphysicals and Milton (1956)
The Nature of Comedy and Shakespeare (1958)
The Epic Strain in the English Novel (1958)
Poetry Direct and Oblique (1959) Chatto & Windus
The Muse Unchained: An Intimate Account of the Revolution in English Studies at Cambridge (1958)
Myth and the English Mind (originally Some Mythical Elements in English Literature) The Clark Lectures (1959-1960)
Essays Literary & Educational (1962)
Shakespeare's Early Comedies (1965)
Comus & Some Shorter Poems Of Milton (1967) with Phyllis B. Tillyard

See also
English Renaissance
Allegory in Renaissance literature
The Wars of the Roses

References

External links
 

1889 births
1962 deaths
Alumni of Jesus College, Cambridge
British Army personnel of World War I
British classical scholars
English literary critics
Fellows of Jesus College, Cambridge
Masters of Jesus College, Cambridge
Officers of the Order of the British Empire